Sandra Stap Clifton (born May 1, 1956) is an American former professional tennis player.

Stap grew up in Deerfield, Illinois and was coached by her father Jake, an ex-baseball player who invented the tennis ball hopper. Her elder sister, Sue Stap, also played professional tennis.

An Orange Bowl (16s) winner in 1970, Stap spent the next decade on tour and also played varsity tennis for Trinity University, where she was a three-time All-American. She won a gold medal in women's doubles gold at the 1975 Pan American Games in Mexico City, partnering Trinity teammate Stephanie Tolleson.

From 1980 to 1989 she served as women's head coach for Northwestern University, which included a span of four successive undefeated Big Ten seasons. They had fifth-place finishes in the NCAA Championships in 1986 and 1987.

References

External links
 
 

1956 births
Living people
American female tennis players
Trinity Tigers women's tennis players
Northwestern Wildcats coaches
Pan American Games gold medalists for the United States
Pan American Games medalists in tennis
Medalists at the 1975 Pan American Games
Tennis players at the 1975 Pan American Games
Tennis players from Chicago
People from Deerfield, Illinois
American tennis coaches
College tennis coaches in the United States